Joseph Bernard Klemp is an American atmospheric scientist who collaborated in groundbreaking work advancing numerical simulation techniques and uncovering the dynamics of atmospheric convection, including supercell thunderstorms, tornadoes, squall lines, as well as mountain waves.

See also 
 National Center for Supercomputing Applications

References

External links 
 UCAR page
 

American atmospheric scientists
American chemical engineers
Stanford University alumni
Carl-Gustaf Rossby Research Medal recipients
Year of birth missing (living people)
Living people